Tanasevitchia is a genus of Asian sheet weavers that was first described by Y. M. Marusik & Michael I. Saaristo in 1999.  it contains only two species, both found in Russia: T. strandi and T. uralensis.

See also
 List of Linyphiidae species (Q–Z)

References

Araneomorphae genera
Linyphiidae
Spiders of Russia